Exocoetus volitans, commonly known as the tropical two-wing flyingfish or blue flyingfish, is a species of ray-finned fish native to tropical and subtropical seas. It can glide above the surface of the sea to escape predators.

Description
The dorsal fin has no spines and 12 to 15 soft rays while the anal fin has no spines and 12 to 14 soft rays. The exceptionally large pectoral fins enable this fish to glide for long distances above the surface of the water. The upper parts of the body are an iridescent dark blue colour while the belly is silvery white. The pectoral fins and tail fin are greyish while the other fins are colourless. Juvenile fish are sometimes barred with black. This species can be distinguished from the oceanic two-wing flyingfish (Exocoetus obtusirostris) by having a less blunt snout and by the origin of the anal fin being at a location behind the origin of the dorsal fin.

Distribution and habitat
Exocoetus volitans is present in the tropical and subtropical zones of all the world's oceans. Its range includes the Caribbean Sea and the western part of the Mediterranean Sea, but it is absent from the Gulf of Mexico and largely absent from the inland southeastern Asian seas such as the Celebes Sea, the Sulu Sea and the Flores Sea. It is found in surface waters both in the open ocean and close to the coast.

Ecology

E. volitans feeds in the open sea on crustaceans, such as copepods, and other planktonic fauna. The female lays her clutches of 300 or 400 eggs in the open water. This fish sometimes launches itself into the air in an attempt to escape from predators such as tuna, dolphinfishes (Coryphaena), snake mackerel (Gempylus serpens) and the rainbow runner (Elagatis bipinnulata). However, in so doing, it exposes itself to a different set of predators in the form of gulls, cormorants and other aquatic birds. It often exits the water in shoals and sometimes lands on the decks of boats. E. volitans have a high level of genetic similarity caused by a high rate of gene flow and a high level of population expansion, recently.

Status
This flyingfish is abundant in the tropical and subtropical parts of all oceans. It is not fished commercially, and no particular threats have been identified, so the International Union for Conservation of Nature has assessed its conservation status as being of "least concern".

References

Exocoetidae
Fish described in 1758
Taxa named by Carl Linnaeus
Fish of the Pacific Ocean
Fish of the Atlantic Ocean